See also the murder ballad The Knoxville Girl.

Knoxville Girls was a short-lived American, New York City based, alternative rock supergroup that contained: Bob Bert (of Sonic Youth and Pussy Galore), on drums, Jerry Teel (of Boss Hog and Little Porkchop) on vocals, guitars; Kid Congo Powers (of The Gun Club and The Cramps) on guitar and vocals; Jack Martin (of Little Porkchop and Blackstrap Molasses Family) on guitar; and Barry London (of Stab City) on organ.

The group released two albums: Knoxville Girls in 1999, and Paper Suit in 2001, before disbanding.

References

External links 
Knoxville Girls web site

Rock music supergroups
Musical groups established in 1999
In the Red artists
1999 establishments in New York City